Bert Bertrand was a journalist from Belgium. He was the son of the cartoonist Yvan Delporte. He played a major role in the early days of punk rock in Belgium. In 1983, he committed suicide. He may also have been the one to be responsible for the name Plastic Bertrand..

Work 
 Press
 More
 En Attendant
 Le Trombone Illustré
 Music
 Songwriter and singer for The Bowling Balls

External links
 The Bowling Balls – jannin.com
 http://www.actuabd.com/rubrique.php3?id_rubrique=1&debut_articles=50
 http://www.actuabd.com/article.php3?id_article=1180

20th-century Belgian journalists
Male journalists
Suicides in New York (state)
1983 suicides
Year of birth missing